Kabalichi is a rural locality (a selo) in Bryansky District, Bryansk Oblast, Russia. The population was 626 as of 2013. There are 8 streets.

Geography 
Kabalichi is located 3 km north of Glinishchevo (the district's administrative centre) by road. Glinishchevo is the nearest rural locality.

References 

Rural localities in Bryansky District